The Michigan's 4th senate district special election, 2016 was held on November 8, 2016, alongside elections to the 14 U.S. Representatives from the state of Michigan, one from each of the state's 14 congressional districts. The election coincided with the 2016 U.S. presidential election, as well as other elections to the House of Representatives, elections to the United States Senate and various state and local elections. The deadline for candidates to file for the August 2 primary election is April 19.

Background
Virgil Smith Jr., a former member of the Michigan House of Representatives was elected to represent Michigan's 4th Senate District in 2010 and 2014. Smith was arrested on May 10, 2015, for allegedly shooting at his ex-wife's SUV, riddling it with bullets and totaling it and was charged with multiple felonies. Two days later, Smith was removed from all of his committee posts, his leadership post and removed from the Senate Democratic caucus. On February 11, 2016, Smith agreed to plead guilty to malicious destruction of personal property $20,000 or more. Per his plea agreement, Smith will serve 10 months in the Wayne County Jail, resign from the state Senate and serve five years of probation where he will not be allowed to hold public office. At his March 14, 2016, sentencing, Wayne County Circuit Court Judge Lawrence Talon sentenced Smith but said it would be illegal for him to require Smith resign from office or not hold office during his probation. Wayne County Prosecutor Kym Worthy said if Smith does not resign, her office would rescind Smith's plea agreement. At a hearing on March 28, 2016, Talon refused a request from the Wayne County Prosecutor's Office to rescind Smith's plea agreement and take the case to trial, seeing as he had yet resigned his Senate seat. Immediately after the hearing, Smith was taken into custody to begin serving his 10-month jail sentence. On March 31, 2016, Smith submitted his resignation to Michigan Senate Majority Leader Arlan Meekhof, effective April 12, 2016.

When Smith's resignation became official, Gov. Rick Snyder called a special election to fill the remaining portion of the term, with the special primary and general elections scheduled for August 2 and November 8, alongside Michigan's regularly scheduled primary and general elections.

Democratic primary

Candidates
James Cole Jr.
Ian Conyers
Fred Durhal Jr.
Patricia A. Holmes
Vanessa Simpson Olive
Carron L. Pinkins
Ralph R. Rayner
H. Helena Scott
Howard Worthy

Results

Republican primary

Candidates
Keith Franklin

Results

General Election

References

2016 Michigan elections
Government of Detroit
Michigan's 4th senate district